The Minister for Social Protection is a senior minister in the Government of Ireland and leads the Department of Social Protection.

The current Minister for Social Protection is Heather Humphreys. She is also Minister for Rural and Community Development and Minister for Justice. She is assisted by two Ministers of State:
Joe O'Brien, TD – Minister of State for Community Development and Charities 
Neale Richmond, TD – Minister of State for Redundancy and Insolvency Operations and Employer Services

Overview
The position was created in 1947 as the Minister for Social Welfare. Its present title dates from 2020. The department formulates appropriate social protection policies and administers and manages the delivery of statutory and non-statutory schemes and services. It is also responsible for the delivery of a range of social insurance and social assistance schemes including provision for unemployment, illness, maternity, caring, widowhood, retirement and old age.

List of office-holders

Notes

References

External links
Minister for Social Protection

Social Protection
Social Protection
Ireland, Social Protection
Department of Social Protection
1947 establishments in Ireland